Poraniopsis inflata, the spiny sea star, is a species of starfish in the family Poraniidae. It is native to the Pacific Ocean and is found in deep water off the coast of North America.

Description
The aboral surface bears a moderate number of short conical spines with white tips. The skin colour is typically orange but can be brownish-white or white marked with violet.

Biology
Poraniopsis inflata feeds on sponges.

Distribution
Poraniopsis inflata is native to the western coast of North America. Its range extends from southeastern Alaska to San Diego, California. It is an uncommon species and is found on rocky substrates in deep water in the Monterey region.

References

Poraniidae
Animals described in 1906
Fauna of the Pacific Ocean